Sutton (Ahtna: Ts'es Tac'ilaexde; Dena'ina: Ts'es Tuk'ilaght) is a census-designated place (CDP) in the Matanuska-Susitna Borough in the U.S. state of Alaska. At the 2020 census the population was 1,038, down from 1,447 in 2010. The CDP includes the former coal mining community and road construction camp of Sutton, as well as the former mining camps of Eska and Jonesville.

Geography
Sutton-Alpine is located in southeastern Matanuska-Susitna Borough at  (61.712473, -148.885625), 52–72 miles (84–116 km) northeast of Anchorage along the Glenn Highway. It sits along Alaska Route 1, the Glenn Highway, between Buffalo Soapstone to the west and Chickaloon to the east. The Matanuska River forms the southern edge of the CDP.

Climate
Sutton has a continental subarctic climate (Köppen Dfc) with cold, snowy winters and mild summers.

Demographics

Sutton-Alpine first appeared on the 1940 U.S. Census as the unincorporated village of "Sutton." It did not appear on the 1950 census, but did return in 1960 and 1970. In 1980, Sutton was made a census-designated place (CDP). In 2000, the name was changed to the present Sutton-Alpine. The area of the CDP includes the aforementioned Sutton as well as the former mining villages of Eska (1950 pop: 54, 1960 pop.: 53) and Jonesville (1950 pop: 97).

As of the census of 2000, there were 1,080 people, 278 households, and 179 families residing in the CDP.  The population density was 7.1 people per square mile (2.8/km2).  There were 352 housing units at an average density of 2.3/sq mi (0.9/km2).  The racial makeup of the CDP was 67.50% White, 4.54% Black or African American, 22.41% Native American, 0.28% Asian, 0.37% Pacific Islander, 0.74% from other races, and 4.17% from two or more races.  1.57% of the population were Hispanic or Latino of any race.

There were 278 households, out of which 34.9% had children under the age of 18 living with them, 52.5% were married couples living together, 6.5% had a female householder with no husband present, and 35.3% were non-families. 29.5% of all households were made up of individuals, and 6.1% had someone living alone who was 65 years of age or older.  The average household size was 2.53 and the average family size was 3.09.

In the CDP the population was spread out, with 19.3% under the age of 18, 9.8% from 18 to 24, 40.7% from 25 to 44, 25.0% from 45 to 64, and 5.2% who were 65 years of age or older.  The median age was 37 years. For every 100 females, there were 208.6 males.  For every 100 females age 18 and over, there were 261.8 males.

The median income for a household in the CDP was $35,652, and the median income for a family was $36,563. Males had a median income of $31,827 versus $28,750 for females. The per capita income for the CDP was $20,436.  About 6.9% of families and 11.3% of the population were below the poverty line, including 15.8% of those under age 18 and 5.7% of those age 65 or over.

History
The first people in Sutton were the Ahtna and Dena'ina Athabascans, who called Sutton Ts'es Tac'ilaexde and Ts'es Tuk'ilaght, respectively. In both languages, the name means "where fish run among rocks"

See also
Sutton Community Hall

References

External links
 Alaska Division of Community Advocacy - Community Information Summary 

Anchorage metropolitan area
Census-designated places in Matanuska-Susitna Borough, Alaska
Mining communities in Alaska